Butterfield is an English surname. Notable people with the surname include:

 Alexander Porter Butterfield (born 1926), official in the Nixon administration during the Watergate scandal
 Asa Butterfield (born 1997), English actor
 Benjamin Butterfield, British immigrant who was the founder of Chelmsford, Massachusetts, first Butterfield in America
 Billy Butterfield (aka Charles William Butterfield) (1917–1988), American jazz trumpeter and bandleader
 Brian James Butterfield (born 1958), Third base coach and infield instructor for the Boston Red Sox
 Daniel Adams Butterfield (1831–1901), United States Civil War Union general, "Taps" composer
 Danny Butterfield (aka Daniel Paul Butterfield) (born 1979), English footballer
 Dave Butterfield (born 1954), American football player
 Deborah Kay Butterfield (born 1949), U.S. artist
 Don Kiethly Butterfield (1923–2006), American tuba player
 George Kenneth Butterfield Jr. (born 1947), member of U.S. House of Representatives from North Carolina
 Herbert Butterfield (1900–1979), historian, author of 'The Whig Interpretation of History'
 Isaac Butterfield, American officer in the revolutionary war who surrendered in the Battle of the Cedars to George Forster
 Jack Butterfield (ice hockey) (aka John Arlington Butterfield) (1919–2010), president of the American Hockey League for 28 years from 1966 to 1994
 Jack Butterfield (baseball) (1929–1979), college baseball coach at Maine and South Florida and New York Yankees executive
 Jack Butterfield (footballer) (1922–2001), English footballer
 Jacob Luke Butterfield (born 1990), English footballer
 James Butterfield (aka Jim Butterfield) (born 1950), rower for Bermuda at the 1972 Olympics
 James Austin Butterfield (1837–1891), American composer of "When You and I Were Young, Maggie" 
 Phillip James Butterfield Jr. (aka Jim Butterfield) (1927–2002), an American football player and coach
 Jeff Butterfield (1929–2004), international rugby union player
 Jeremy Nicholas Butterfield (born 1954), philosopher
 Jim Butterfield (aka Frank James Butterfield) (1936–2007), Canadian computer programmer
 Jo Butterfield (aka Joanna Shuni Butterfield) (born 1979), British field athlete 
 Jock Butterfield (aka John Rutherford Butterfield) (1932–2004), New Zealand rugby league footballer
 John Butterfield, Baron Butterfield (aka William John Hughes Butterfield) (1920–2000), British medical researcher and administrator
 John Warren Butterfield (1801–1869), founder of Butterfield Overland Mail
 Orville Orland Butterfield, The false lynching of Orlando Butterfield, The Tuskegee Institute 24 July 1883 in the book Lynching and Mob Violence in Ohio, 1772–1938
 Len Butterfield (aka Leonard Arthur Butterfield) (1913–1999), New Zealand cricketer
 Rosaria Champagne Butterfield (born 1962), religious writer
 Paul Vaughn Butterfield (1942–1987), American blues musician, singer and harmonica player
 Spencer Darren Butterfield (born 1992), American basketball player
 Stewart Butterfield (aka Daniel Stewart Butterfield / Dharma Jeremy Butterfield) (born 1973), co-founder of Flickr
 Taahira Naeema Butterfield (born 2000), Bermudian sprinter
 Thomas Butterfield (–1943), Australian politician 
 Thomas C. Butterfield, mayor of Cork, Ireland from 1916 to 1919
 Tony Butterfield (aka Anthony Butterfield) (born 1966), Australian rugby league footballer
 Tyler Barbour Butterfield (born 1983), Bermudian cyclist and triathlete
 William Butterfield (British architect) (1814–1900), British architect
 William Butterfield (American architect) (aka William M. Butterfield) (1860–1932), American architect
 William Butterfield (auctioneer), founder of auction house Butterfield & Butterfield

English-language surnames